Aspasmichthys is a genus of clingfishes from the western Pacific Ocean.

Species
There are currently two recognized species in this genus:
 Aspasmichthys alorensis G. R. Allen & Erdmann, 2012
 Aspasmichthys ciconiae (D. S. Jordan & Fowler, 1902)

References

 
Gobiesocidae